Pierre Cao (born 22 December 1937 in Dudelange) is a Luxembourgian composer and conductor. He studied composition and conducting at the Royal Conservatory of Brussels.

Classical music
Cao is the regular conductor of Arsys Bourgogne with whom he has recorded Biber's Requiem and other baroque works. He taught at the Luxembourg Conservatoire until 1998 and has led various vocal ensembles in Luxembourg and the surrounding region. Cao is a co-founder of the Institut Européen du Chant Choral (INECC).

Selected discography
 Liszt – piano concertos. Orchestre Symphonique de la Radio-Télé Luxembourg de France.
 Giovanni Felice Sances, Johann Michael Zächer & Johann Melchior Gletle – Vespers in Vienna. Ambroisie.
 Bach – Motets Les Basses Réunies. Ambroisie 2006
 Michael Haydn – Missa Sancti Hieronymi MH 254 & Georg Druschetzky Messe en si bémol majeur. Johannette Zomer, Guy de Mey et Britta Schwarz. Festival d'Ambronay 2007
 Théodore Gouvy – Electre, opus 85 – scène dramatique pour solistes, choeur et orchestre. François Pollet, Michael Myers, Marcel Vanaud, Cécile Eloir. Choeurs et Orchestre Symphonique de Nancy. (2CD) K617 1999

Eurovision
Cao was the musical director for both the 1973 and 1984 Eurovision Song Contests, staged in the Grand Duchy at the Nouveau Theatre. He conducted Luxembourg's winning song "Tu te reconnaîtras" in 1973. As such, he was the only conductor ever conducting one of Luxembourg's five winning Eurovision entries. Unusually, he did not conduct Luxembourg's entry in 1984 (it was conducted by Pascal Stive), despite being the show's musical director. He did however conduct the German and Cypriot entries.

References

1937 births
Living people
21st-century conductors (music)
21st-century male musicians
Luxembourgian composers
Luxembourgian conductors (music)
Male conductors (music)
Eurovision Song Contest conductors
People from Dudelange